Marcel-Jacques Dubois (1920–2007) was a French academic and theologian of the Dominican Order and a naturalized citizen of Israel. He was linked to Bruno Hussar's House of Isaiah and involved in Relations between Catholicism and Judaism. He was professor of philosophy at the Hebrew University of Jerusalem (where he served as chairman of department) and was on the 1974 Commission of the Holy See for Religious Relations with the Jews. He had significance as an orthodox Dominican who rejected supersessionism. He spent much to most of his life in Israel and Teddy Kollek declared him an "Honored Citizen of Jerusalem". He participated in a series of televised debates with Israeli thinker Yeshayahu Leibowitz. In 1996 he won the Israel Prize for his work for Israeli society.

References 

1920 births
2007 deaths
People from Tourcoing
Academic staff of the Hebrew University of Jerusalem
French academics
Dominican theologians
20th-century French Catholic theologians
Catholic philosophers
20th-century French philosophers
French male writers
French emigrants to Israel
20th-century French male writers